Siffrey Point is a low rocky point projecting from the north coast of Trinity Peninsula, Antarctica situated  west-northwest of Cape Dubouzet,  east-southeast of Prime Head and  northwest of Mount Bransfield. The feature is a reidentification of "Cap Siffrey," named by Captain Jules Dumont d'Urville in 1838.

Headlands of Trinity Peninsula